Örménykút is a village in Békés County, in the Southern Great Plain region of south-east Hungary.

Geography 
It covers an area of 54.56 km² and has a population of 549 people (2002).

References

Slovak communities in Hungary
Populated places in Békés County